Gyrid Olafsdottir of Sweden, also called Gyritha or perhaps Gunnhild (10th-century), according to legends was a Swedish princess and a Danish queen consort as the spouse of King Harald Bluetooth of Denmark.

Biography
In the sagas Gyrid was the daughter of King Olof Björnsson of Sweden and Queen Ingeborg Thrandsdotter.

According to several sagas, her brother, Prince Styrbjörn Starke, accompanied her to Denmark in order to arrange her marriage to Harald Bluetooth. Styrbjörn Starke in turn married Tyra (Tyri Haraldsdatter), who was a daughter of Harald Bluetooth.

After the death of King Harald (around 985), nothing more is recorded about Gyrid.

The Danish historians Arild Huitfeldt (1603) and Jakob Langebek (1772) record Gyrid/Gyritha as one of the two wives of Harald Bluetooth - the other being Thora (Tófa ?).

Sagas
 Styrbjarnar þáttr Svíakappa
 Eyrbyggja saga
 Hervarar saga
 Knýtlinga saga
 Gesta Danorum

References

Harald Bluetooth
Year of death missing
House of Munsö